Myalls are any of a group of closely related and very similar species of Acacia:
 Acacia binervia, commonly known as coast myall;
 A. papyrocarpa, commonly known as western myall;
 a weeping form of the species, commonly known as water myall;
 A. pendula, commonly known as weeping myall, true myall, or myall;
 A. sibilans, commonly known as northern myall.
Note
Hostile Aboriginal groups were called Myalls in the early days of Australian colonization, and probably came from a word meaning "men". According to C. Lumholtz (1890), the European usage was picked up by "civilized" Aboriginals and used as a term of contempt for their less sophisticated brethren. Quoted in 

Australian Aboriginal words and phrases